Jan Przewoźnik (born 16 September 1957) is a Polish chess player who won the Polish Chess Championship in 1979. FIDE International Master (1985).

Chess career
From 1976 to 1992 Jan Przewoźnik played seven times in the Polish Chess Championship's finals. In 1979 he won title in Tarnów. Przewoźnik was a multiple medalist in Polish Team Chess Championship, including six gold medals.
 He shared first place in international tournament in Helsinki (1991) and second place in Nałęczów (1986).

Jan Przewoźnik played for Poland in Chess Olympiads:
 In 1980, at second reserve board in the 24th Chess Olympiad in La Valletta (+1, =1, -2).

Psychology
Jan Przewoźnik graduated Faculty of Psychology from Catholic University of Lublin (1984). Despite a high level of chess he works as a business consultant in psychology. In March 2014 Przewoźnik defended Doctor degree thesis "Thinking strategies in complex chess game situations".

References

External links

 
 player profile at 365chess.com

1957 births
Polish chess players
Chess International Masters
Chess Olympiad competitors
John Paul II Catholic University of Lublin alumni
Polish psychologists
Living people